= Weaver Knob =

Mountain in West Virginia, United States

Coordinates: 37.8617874°N 80.4497984°W

Weaver Knob is a summit in West Virginia. With an elevation of 2,572 feet (784 m), Weaver Knob is the 833rd highest summit in the state of West Virginia.

Weaver Knob was named after an early settler who was a weaver.
